Sơn Dương is a rural district of Tuyên Quang province in the Northeast region of Vietnam.  the district had a population of 183,600. The district covers an area of 789 km². The district capital lies at Sơn Dương.

References

Districts of Tuyên Quang province
Tuyên Quang province